Margaret Mary Damer Dawson OBE (12 June 1873 – 18 May 1920) was a prominent anti-vivisectionist and philanthropist who co-founded the first British women's police service.

Life
Margaret Dawson was born on 12 June 1873 to a wealthy family in Burgess Hill and grew up in Hove. After her father, Richard Dawson, died her mother remarried, becoming Lady Walsingham. Her step-father was Thomas de Grey, 6th Baron Walsingham. Dawson had a private income and studied music with the Austrian pianist Benno Schoenberger at the London Academy of Music. She became involved in anti-vivisection and other  causes and founded a home for foundlings. She was awarded silver medals by Finland and Denmark for her campaigning work for animal rights.

Dawson was honorary secretary of the International Anti-Vivisection Council set up in 1908 by Lizzy Lind af Hageby, and together they organised the International Anti-Vivisection and Animal Protection Congress in London in July 1909.  As Honorary Organising Secretary of the Animal Defence and Anti-Vivisection Society. The organisation campaigned against cruelty and the socially acceptable circus performing animals and the slaughter of animals for meat. In 1911 she was living with prominent ant-vivisectionist Lizzy Lind af Hageby.

In 1914 she and Nina Boyle founded the Women Police Volunteers (WPV), but a year later the pair split due to disagreements over the organisation's role. Dawson founded and led a new organisation, the Women's Police Service (renamed the Women's Auxiliary Service after the First World War), though Boyle's WPV continued some patrols. Dawson and her second-in-command Allen were both awarded an Order of the British Empire in 1918.

Dawson was also asked to advise the Baird Commission when it looked at the role women in policing. She and many of her followers had been excluded from being on the Baird Commission on the advice of the Police Commissioner who disliked lesbians and in particular Dawson. Dawson thought that the women's police force should be entirely separate from the male service. Her view did not prevail and she died prematurely of a heart attack in 1920. Her leadership role was taken over by Mary Allen, who had been Dawson's assistant for many years. They had lived together during the first World War, having a close professional and personal relationship. Dawson died on 18 May 1920 and left her house and most of her money to Allen.

Dawson was buried in Lympne on 22 May 1920 after a funeral attended by other women police officers. A memorial was erected in the corner of Lympne churchyard. Her finances had dwindled as she had spent money on the voluntary police service. The home she shared with Mary Allen was left to her.

Commemorations
Dawson's house at 10 Cheyne Walk has a plaque to commemorate her. A bird bath, installed in Cheyne Walk, was organised by Miss St John Partridge and designed by Charles Pibworth It has since been restored and incorporates a quote from Rime of the Ancient Mariner "He prayeth best who lovest best all things great and small".

References

Further reading
Allen, Mary S. (1936) Lady in Blue, London: Stanley Paul

External links

1873 births
1920 deaths
Anti-vivisectionists
British animal rights activists
British women police officers